Leonel de Lima (1403-1495) was a Portuguese nobleman, Viscount of Vila Nova de Cerveira.

Biography 

Leonel was born in Vila Nova de Cerveira, Portugal, son of Fernão Anes de Lima and Teresa da Silva. Leonel was married to Filipa da Cunha, daughter of Álvaro da Cunha (Lord of Pombeiro) and Beatriz Martins de Melo.

References 

1403 births
People from Viana do Castelo District
1495 deaths
15th-century Portuguese people
Portuguese nobility
Portuguese Roman Catholics